Spenard may refer to:

 Joe Spenard (1879–1934), a Canadian-born American businessman
 Spenard, Anchorage, a major neighborhood in Anchorage, Alaska, named for Joe Spenard
 Spenard Builders Supply, a chain of stores in Alaska selling construction and home improvement supplies, founded in Spenard in the 1950s
 Lake Spenard, a lake in the southwestern corner of Spenard, part of Lake Hood Seaplane Base
 "Spenard divorce", a popular colloquialism in Alaska describing spousal homicide